Finland has participated in the Eurovision Song Contest 55 times since its debut in .

Since the introduction of the semi-finals in 2004, Finland has failed to reach the final eight times.

In , Finland finished last in the first semi-final with the shortest-ever Eurovision entry, "" performed by Pertti Kurikan Nimipäivät.

History

Before the 2006 victory, Finland was considered by many as the ultimate under-achiever of Eurovision. Prior to its triumph, it had placed last a total of eight times, once with nul points after the introduction of the current scoring method. Finland's entry in 1982, "" by Kojo, was one of only fifteen songs since the modern scoring system was instituted in 1975 to earn no points. (Norway had placed last eleven times and scored zero points four times, but had also won twice before 2006). Due to low results, Finland was excluded from the contest in 1995, 1997, 1999, 2001, and 2003.

In 2006, Finland won with the band Lordi and its song "Hard Rock Hallelujah", an entry different from the mainstream europop that dominated the competition. The song broke records scoring the highest number of points in the history of the Eurovision Song Contest, with 292. The record was eventually broken by Norway in 2009, with 387.

In 2015, Finland finished last in the first semi-final with the shortest-ever Eurovision song, the one minute and 27 seconds "" performed by Pertti Kurikan Nimipäivät. Finland reached the final for the first time in four years in 2018, with Saara Aalto placing 25th. After a non-qualification in 2019 with Darude featuring Sebastian Rejman, Finland gained its joint-second best result to date in 2021, with Blind Channel placing 6th.

All of Finland's entries were in English between 1973 and 1976 and again since 2000 (except in 2008, 2010, 2012, 2015 and 2023); both of these periods allowed submissions in any language. Two entries, 1990 and 2012, were in Swedish, which is an official language in Finland alongside Finnish. All of Finland's other songs have been in Finnish.

Participation overview

Hostings

Awards

Marcel Bezençon Awards

Related involvement

Conductors

Commentators and spokespersons

Photogallery

See also
Finland in the Eurovision Dance Contest – Dance version of the Eurovision Song Contest.
Finland in the Eurovision Young Dancers – A competition organised by the EBU for younger dancers aged between 16 and 21.
Finland in the Eurovision Young Musicians – A competition organised by the EBU for musicians aged 18 years and younger.

Notes

References

 
Countries in the Eurovision Song Contest